The Lata Mangeshkar Award is a national-level award instituted to honour works in the field of music. Various state governments of India present awards with this name. The state Government of Madhya Pradesh started this award in 1984. The award consists of a certificate of merit and a cash prize. There is also a Lata Mangeshkar Award issued by the Maharashtra Government starting from 1992. This is also officially known as "Lata Mangeshkar Award for Lifetime Achievement". Another award is given by the Andhra Pradesh Government.

Recipients 
The recipients of the Lata Mangeshkar Award are as follows:

Government of Madhya Pradesh

Government of Maharashtra
As of 2014, the award presented by the Maharashtra government, the Lata Mangeshkar Award for Lifetime Achievement, consisted of cash reward of 5,00,000, a citation, a trophy and a shawl.

Government of Andhra Pradesh

References 

Indian music awards
1984 establishments in Madhya Pradesh
Awards established in 1984
Lata Mangeshkar